Zoltán Turcsányi (November 7, 1914 – April 16, 2002) was a Hungarian field hockey player who competed in the 1936 Summer Olympics.

He was born in Rábapatona, Győr-Moson-Sopron County.

In 1936 he was a member of the Hungarian team which was eliminated in the group stage of the Olympic tournament. He played two matches as halfback and forward.

External links
 
Zoltán Turcsányi's profile at Sports Reference.com
Zoltán Turcsányi's profile at the Hungarian Olympic Committee

1914 births
2002 deaths
Hungarian male field hockey players
Olympic field hockey players of Hungary
Field hockey players at the 1936 Summer Olympics